Ptyktoptychion is an extinct genus of chimaeras known from the Early Cretaceous of Australia.

References

Prehistoric cartilaginous fish genera
Cretaceous cartilaginous fish
Prehistoric fish of Australia
Chimaeriformes